Ponnagyun is a town in Rakhine State, in the westernmost part of Myanmar (Burma). It is the administrative seat of the Ponnagyun Township. The U-rit-taung Pagoda, across the Kaladan River from Ponnagyun, overlooks the town.

References

External links
 Satellite map at Maplandia.com

Township capitals of Myanmar
Populated places in Rakhine State